Walter H. Paulo (March 6, 1902 – December 12, 1984) was a member of the Ohio House of Representatives.

References

1906 births
Republican Party members of the Ohio House of Representatives
1984 deaths
20th-century American politicians
Politicians from Mansfield, Ohio